Local elections were held in the province of Cebu on May 13, 2019, as part of the 2019 Philippine general election. Voters selected from among candidates for all local positions: a town mayor, vice mayor and town councilors, as well as members of the Sangguniang Panlalawigan, the vice governor, governor and representatives for the seven districts of Cebu (including two districts of Cebu City and the lone district of Lapu-Lapu City).

Gubernatorial and Vice Gubernatorial race

Governor
Vice Governor Agnes Magpale ran for the first time as governor and was defeated by her opponent, former Governor Gwendolyn Garcia, who was also serving as representative of Cebu's third legislative district.

Vice Governor
Magpale's running mate was Governor Hilario Davide III while Garcia's running mate was businesswoman Daphne Salimbangon.

Congressional race

1st District

2nd District
Wilfredo Caminero is the incumbent.

3rd District

4th District

5th District

6th District

7th District

Cebu City

1st District
Raul del Mar ran for his third and final term, and won. His opponent is actor and businessman Richard Yap. Yap is known for his character as Richard "Sir Chief" Lim in the drama series Be Careful with My Heart.

2nd District
Rodrigo Abellanosa ran for his third and final term, and won.

Lapu-Lapu City

Sangguniang Panlalawigan

1st District

|bgcolor=black colspan=5|

2nd District

|bgcolor=black colspan=5|

3rd District

|bgcolor=black colspan=5|

4th District

|bgcolor=black colspan=5|

5th District

|bgcolor=black colspan=5|

6th District

|bgcolor=black colspan=5|

7th District

|bgcolor=black colspan=5|

City and municipal elections

1st District, mayoral elections

Carcar

Naga City

Talisay City

Minglanilla

San Fernando

Sibonga

2nd District, mayoral elections

Alcoy

Argao

Boljoon

Dalaguete

Oslob

Samboan

Santander

3rd District, mayoral elections

Toledo City

Aloguinsan

Asturias

Balamban

Barili

Pinamungajan

Tuburan

4th District, mayoral elections

Bogo

Bantayan

Daanbantayan

Madridejos

Medellin

San Remigio

Santa Fe

Tabogon

Tabuelan

5th District, mayoral elections

Danao

Borbon

Carmen

Catmon

Compostela

Liloan

Pilar

Poro

San Francisco

Sogod

Tudela

6th District, mayoral elections

Mandaue City

Consolacion

Cordova

7th District, mayoral elections

Alcantara

Alegria

Badian

Dumanjug

Ginatilan

Malabuyoc

Moalboal

Ronda

Cebu City, mayoral elections

Lapu-Lapu City, mayoral elections

References

External links
2019 election results portal
COMELEC official website

2019 Philippine local elections
Elections in Cebu
May 2019 events in the Philippines